Jacob Cederholm (born January 30, 1998) is a Swedish former professional ice hockey defenceman. He was selected 97th overall in the 2016 NHL Entry Draft by the Winnipeg Jets. He is the younger brother of Anton who also plays in Sweden and was drafted by the Vancouver Canucks.

Playing career
At the age of 16, Cederholm made his Swedish Hockey League debut playing with HV71 during the 2014–15 SHL season. In the 2016–17 season, Cederholm was loaned out to continue his development on loan with IK Pantern of the HockeyAllsvenskan.

At the conclusion of the 2017–18 season, Cederholm left HV71 and Sweden for North America, agreeing to an initial professional try-out  contract with the Manitoba Moose in the AHL, affiliate of the Winnipeg Jets on April 5, 2018. He appeared in 1 regular season game with the Moose and remained on the roster as a healthy scratch through the post-season.

As a free agent, Cederholm secured a one-year AHL contract to continue his development with the Manitoba Moose, on July 3, 2018.

At the conclusion of his contract with the Manitoba Moose, Cederholm opted to remain in the ECHL, returning for a third season with affiliate the Jacksonville Icemen on 8 September 2020. After 33 regular season games with the Icemen, posting 1 goal and 4 points in the 2020–21 season, Cederholm opted to retire from professional hockey having played 7 seasons on May 28, 2021.

Career statistics

Regular season and playoffs

International

References

External links

1998 births
HV71 players
IK Oskarshamn players
Jacksonville Icemen players
Living people
Manitoba Moose players
Swedish ice hockey defencemen
Västerviks IK players
Winnipeg Jets draft picks
Sportspeople from Helsingborg